Jesús Esperanza (born 13 March 1948) is a Spanish racing cyclist. He rode in the 1973 Tour de France.

References

External links
 

1948 births
Living people
Spanish male cyclists
Place of birth missing (living people)
People from Getafe
Cyclists from the Community of Madrid